Carruthers Cliff is a prominent sub-vertical rock cliff forming the south-southeast flank of Vauréal Peak. Fossilized wood and leaf remains were discovered near the base of these cliffs in 1996. The cliffs were named for Robert George Carruthers (1880–1965), an English stratigrapher, invertebrate palaeontologist, and quaternary geologist with the British Geological Survey. He was the originator of the undermelt theory in which British glacial deposits resulted from a single glacial advance.

References
 

Cliffs of the South Shetland Islands